David Adkins (born November 10, 1956), better known by his stage name Sinbad, is an American stand-up comedian and actor. He became known in the 1990s from being featured on his own HBO specials, appearing on several television series such as Coach Walter Oakes in A Different World (1987–1991) and as David Bryan on The Sinbad Show (1993–1994), and starring in the films Necessary Roughness, Houseguest, First Kid, Jingle All the Way, Good Burger, and Planes.

Early life
Sinbad was born November 10, 1956, in Benton Harbor, Michigan, the son of Louise and a Baptist minister, Dr. Donald Beckley Adkins Sr. He has five siblings: Donna, Dorothea, Mark, Michael, and Donald Jr. His paternal grandmother was of Irish descent. Sinbad attended Benton Harbor High School and graduated in 1974. He attended college from 1974 to 1978 at the University of Denver in Denver, Colorado, where he lettered two seasons for the basketball team.

Military service
Sinbad served in the United States Air Force as a boom operator aboard KC-135 Stratotankers. While assigned to the 384th Air Refueling Wing at McConnell Air Force Base in Wichita, Kansas, he would often travel downtown to perform stand-up comedy. He competed as a comedian/MC in the Air Force's Talent Contest in 1981. Sinbad was almost dismissed with a dishonorable discharge for various misbehaviors, including going AWOL.

After a series of incidents, he was eventually discharged "for parking my car in the wrong position."

Career
In an attempt to stand out in the entertainment industry, Adkins worked under the professional name Sinbad, which he chose out of admiration for Sinbad the Sailor. He began his stand-up comic career appearing on Star Search. Sinbad won his round against fellow comedian Dennis Miller, and made it all the way to the finals before losing to John Kassir.

He soon was cast on The Redd Foxx Show, a short lived sitcom, playing Byron Lightfoot.

A Different World
In 1987, Sinbad landed a role in A Different World, a spin-off of The Cosby Show built around Lisa Bonet's character Denise Huxtable. Previously, Sinbad appeared in a one-off role on The Cosby Show as car salesman Davis Sarrette. While Bonet only stayed with the program for a season, Sinbad stayed with the cast from 1988 until 1991 as Coach Walter Oakes.

Walter began to fall in love with a girl named Jaleesa Vinson, played by Dawnn Lewis. They dated, and eventually became engaged but decided to cancel the wedding due to differing outlooks on life.

The Sinbad Show
By the early 1990s, his popularity had grown enough for Fox to greenlight The Sinbad Show, which premiered September 16, 1993. In it, Sinbad played 35-year-old David Bryan, a bachelor who decides to become a foster parent to two children after becoming emotionally attached to them.

Around that time, Sinbad had received joint custody of his two children: Royce, age 4; and Paige, age 7, and told the press that these experiences informed him of single parenting.

The Sinbad Show was canceled, with the last episode airing April 21, 1994. However, the role earned him a nomination in the 1995 Kids' Choice Awards for "Favorite Television Actor".

Films and other projects

In 1990, Sinbad did his first stand-up comedy special for HBO called Sinbad: Brain Damaged. The special was recorded at Morehouse College in Atlanta, Georgia. In 1993, Sinbad did his next stand up special in New York City's Paramount Theater at Madison Square Garden called Sinbad: Afros and Bellbottoms for which he won a 1995 Image Award. He was brought back in 1996 for Sinbad: Son of a Preacher Man and again in 1997, for Sinbad: Nothin' but the Funk. All of these shows have been released on VHS and DVD.

Sinbad again won an NAACP Image Award in 1998 for his role in Sinbad's Summer Jam III: '70s Soul Music Festival. By 1995, Sinbad created a company called "David & Goliath Productions", that was located in Studio City.

From 1989 to 1991, Sinbad was host of It's Showtime at the Apollo, and returned in 2005, while regular host Mo'Nique was on maternity leave. He hosted an episode of Soul Train that aired January 14, 1995; appeared as a contestant in an episode of Celebrity Jeopardy! in 1998; and was the emcee for the May 2000 Miss Universe Pageant.

During the 1990s, Sinbad guest starred on an episode of Nickelodeon's All That. In one sketch, he played the father of recurring character Ishboo, dubbed "Sinboo". He also made a cameo appearance in the comedy movie Good Burger, starring Kenan & Kel, as "Mr. Wheat", a short-tempered teacher. His character was modeled after Gough Wheat, a past teacher of the movie's producer, Dan Schneider, at White Station High School in Memphis, Tennessee.

He and Phil Hartman co-starred in the comedy film Houseguest, where he plays Kevin Franklin, a Pittsburgh resident who owes $50,000 to the mob. Hartman, as Gary Young, comments to his children that they are waiting to pick up his old college friend, who is black and he has not seen for twenty years. Taking who they think to be a well-known dentist home, Young's family is stabilized by Franklin's own unstable nature. Released January 6, 1995, the film grossed $26 million in North America.

Sinbad's film roles also include First Kid, which he starred in, and Jingle All the Way (1996) opposite Arnold Schwarzenegger, Rita Wilson and the late Phil Hartman. For Jingle All the Way, Sinbad won a Blockbuster Entertainment Award for "Favorite Supporting Actor – Family"; it was also his third and final collaboration with Hartman following the latter's death in May 1998. He also performed his HBO comedy special "Son of a Preacher Man", at the Paramount Theatre in Denver, Colorado.

In March 1996, Sinbad joined First Lady Hillary Clinton and musician Sheryl Crow, in a USO tour in Bosnia and Herzegovina.

The NAACP Image Awards recognized his role in Happily Ever After: Fairy Tales for Every Child (1996), nominating him in the "Outstanding Performance in an Animated/Live-Action/Dramatic Youth or Children's Series/Special" category. He lent his voice to Riley, an animal character, in Homeward Bound II: Lost in San Francisco (1996), and later voiced the horse "Hollywood Shuffle" in Ready to Run.

In 1997, Sinbad released Sinbad's Guide to Life: Because I Know Everything, a book of comedic short essays. It was co written with David Ritz.

In August 1997, Vibe magazine started its own syndicated late night talk show, which aired on UPN, hosted by actor Chris Spencer. Spencer was fired in October, and replaced by Sinbad; the series lasted until the summer of 1998. At that same time, Sinbad performed his HBO comedy special "Nothin' But the Funk" in Aruba's Guillermo P. Trinidad Memorial Stadium.

In 1998 and 1999, Sinbad reunited with Bill Cosby and Carsey-Werner Productions, and appeared in three episodes of Cosby. In February 1999, he was featured in an infomercial for Tae Bo, where he claimed that he was successfully using the Tae Bo system to become an action star.

In 2002, he appeared in three episodes of the Showtime series Resurrection Blvd. In 2004, he was named the No. 78 Greatest Stand Up Comic of All Time on "Comedy Central Presents: 100 Greatest Stand-Ups of All Time". In 2006, Maxim magazine ranked Sinbad as the "Worst Comic of All Time."

In February 2007, actor Mark Curry credited Sinbad and Bill Cosby for helping convince him not to commit suicide. Sinbad was responsible for discovering R&B trio 702, convincing their parents to let him take them to a music convention/competition under the name "Sweeta than Suga"; the group eventually being heard by music producer Michael Bivins.

Sinbad also made a cameo appearance on the television show It's Always Sunny in Philadelphia as himself in a rehab center in the episode "Dennis Reynolds: An Erotic Life", which originally aired October 23, 2008. His cameo was met with positive acclaim from fans of both him and the series.

Sinbad was the host of Thou Shalt Laugh 3. The DVD was released on November 11, 2008.

He performed his Comedy Central television special Where U Been? at Club Nokia, which was later released on DVD to even greater success. On March 14, 2010, he debuted on the Celebrity Apprentice and was fired on the second episode (March 21, 2010) after losing in the Kodak challenge as project manager, placing 13th.

Sinbad starred in a reality show on WE tv called Sinbad: It's Just Family that aired on Tuesdays at 10:00 p.m.; the show was canceled in 2011.

In 2013, Sinbad voiced Roper in the animated film Planes. The same year he had a guest role on the adult animated series American Dad!, voicing an animated version of himself in the episode "Lost in Space", then returning for the 2014 episode "The Longest Distance Relationship", and again in 2015's "Holy Shit, Jeff's Back!"

In April 2015, Sinbad appeared in a USO show at Bagram and Kandahar Air Bases in Afghanistan.

In 2017, he appeared on two episodes of Disney Junior's The Lion Guard, as the voice of Uroho the baboon. The same year, he appeared in a CollegeHumor April Fool's video consisting of newly created footage supposedly taken from a 1990s genie movie called Shazaam which never existed. The comedy drew from an Internet rumor confusing Shazaam with the real genie film titled Kazaam (1996), starring Shaquille O'Neal. The false memories of Shazaam have been explained as a confabulation of memories of the comedian wearing a genie-like costume during a TV presentation of Sinbad the Sailor movies in 1994, In addition, in 1960s, Hanna-Barbera had an animated series about a genie called Shazzan. In 2018-2019 he starred on TV show Rel.

Apple
Sinbad has a long history of using and promoting Apple products, working with Apple and appearing at Apple events.  Examples include numerous appearances at Macworld and WWDC  shows.

On January 25, 2011, he was the celebrity speaker of MacWorld Expo 2011.

Music
Sinbad is also known for his musical abilities, with expertise playing multiple instruments; with drums and percussion being primary, which he most often displays after every show appearance. He has played with numerous artists and musicians under the moniker of "Memphis Red"; such as Dawnn Lewis and Adult-Urban instrumentalist (saxophonist) Journell Henry "p/k/a. J. Henry".

Personal life
Sinbad married Meredith Fuller in 1985. They have two children together. The couple divorced in 1992, but remarried in 2002.

In November 2020, his family announced to the press that Sinbad was recovering from a recent stroke.

Tax issues
In April 2009, Sinbad was listed as one of the ten worst tax debtors in the state of California, owing the state $2.5 million in personal income tax. On December 11, 2009, Sinbad filed for Chapter 7 bankruptcy. On February 5, 2010, it was reported that Sinbad put his  hilltop home up for sale in order to alleviate his tax burdens.

Filmography

Film

Television

See also
 Mononymous person

References

External links

 

1956 births
20th-century American comedians
20th-century American male actors
21st-century American comedians
21st-century American male actors
African-American basketball players
African-American Christians
African-American male actors
African-American male comedians
African-American stand-up comedians
African-American television producers
African-American television talk show hosts
American male comedians
American male film actors
American male television actors
American male voice actors
American men's basketball players
American people of Irish descent
American stand-up comedians
American television talk show hosts
Basketball players from Michigan
Comedians from California
Comedians from Michigan
Denver Pioneers men's basketball players
Film producers from California
Film producers from Michigan
Late night television talk show hosts
Living people
Male actors from Michigan
Participants in American reality television series
People from Benton Harbor, Michigan
People from Hidden Hills, California
Television producers from California
The Apprentice (franchise) contestants
United States Air Force airmen
20th-century African-American sportspeople
21st-century African-American people
Television producers from Michigan